Berlancourt may refer to the following places in France:

 Berlancourt, Aisne, a commune in the department of Aisne
 Berlancourt, Oise, a commune in the department of Oise